The 1916 USC Trojans football team represented the University of Southern California (USC) as an independent the 1916 college football season. In their third non-consecutive year under head coach Dean Cromwell (Cromwell was also coach in 1909 and 1910), the Trojans compiled a 5–3 record and outscored their opponents by a combined total of 129 to 80. The season featured USC's first game against Arizona, a 20–7 victory in Phoenix, its third game against California, a 27–0 loss in Los Angeles, and its second game against Oregon Agricultural, a 16–7 loss in Los Angeles.

Schedule

References

USC Trojans
USC Trojans football seasons
USC Trojans football